Turner Island is a small island in Northern Saskatchewan, Canada; surrounded by Cree Lake.

References

Uninhabited islands of Saskatchewan
Lake islands of Saskatchewan